Richard Higham (July 24, 1851 – March 18, 1905) was an English born professional baseball player born in Ipswich, Suffolk, England and currently the only umpire to be banned from baseball.

Biography
He was born on July 24, 1851, in Ipswich, England. Higham's family immigrated to the United States when he was two years old, and they settled in Hoboken, New Jersey.

During his career he was a very versatile player, fielding multiples positions, mainly as a right fielder and catcher with notable playing time as a second baseman as well. In , he joined the New York Mutuals of the National Association during its inaugural season and played until the league was dissolved after the 1875 season, serving as player-manager in 1874. He then moved on to the newly formed National League, baseball's first recognized major league, where he hit in the first NL triple play against the Mutuals on May 13, . In , he served as captain of the Syracuse Stars in the inaugural year of the International League, which was part of the League Alliance, with whom the National League had a working relationship.

Umpire career and ban 
After his playing days were over, he served as an umpire for two years (though rumors abounded that he was fixing games as a player). He hired a private detective, who turned up several letters between Higham and a well-known gambler. Higham outlined a simple code—if the gambler received a telegram from him saying "Buy all the lumber you can", the gambler was to bet on Detroit. No telegram meant that the gambler was to bet on his opponent.

As a result of this evidence, Higham was fired as an umpire and banned from baseball. To date, he is the only umpire to have been banished from the game.

He moved back to Chicago, Illinois and became a bookkeeper. It was here where he died and was buried at Mount Hope Cemetery.

See also

 List of Major League Baseball annual runs scored leaders
 List of Major League Baseball annual doubles leaders
List of people banned from Major League Baseball
 Tim Donaghy

References

Further reading
Seymore, Harold, Baseball: The Early Years, page 343.
Higham, Harold V., and Larry Gerlach. Dick Higham, Star of Baseball's Early Years. The National Pastime. 21 (2001), 72–80.

External links

Baseball Almanac
BaseballLibrary
SABR Baseball Project
Retrosheet
Umpires timeline from MLB.com

1851 births
1905 deaths
Sportspeople from Ipswich
Major League Baseball right fielders
19th-century baseball players
New York Mutuals (NABBP) players
New York Mutuals players
Baltimore Canaries players
Chicago White Stockings players
Hartford Dark Blues players
Providence Grays players
Troy Trojans players
Major League Baseball players from the United Kingdom
Major League Baseball players from England
English baseball players
New York Mutuals managers
Baseball player-managers
Morrisania Unions players
Sportspeople from Hoboken, New Jersey
English emigrants to the United States
Major League Baseball umpires
Minor league baseball managers
Syracuse Stars (minor league baseball) players
Capital City of Albany players
Rochester Hop Bitters players
Sportspeople banned for life
Burials at Mount Hope Cemetery (Chicago)